R-kioski (known as R-kiosk in Estonia) is a chain of convenience stores that is part of the Reitan Convenience and owned by the Reitan Group. Reitan's Nordic and Baltic portfolio under the R-kioski umbrella comprises R-kioski in Finland, R-kiosk in Estonia and Lietuvos Spauda in Lithuania. There are 560 R-kioski shops across Finland . They sell a range of products, such as books, magazines, tobacco, ready meals, snacks, soft drinks and alcoholic drinks such as beer and cider, excluding wine and spirits. R-kioski shops also provide services such as the various "Veikkaus" games, prepaid SIM cards and top-up vouchers, fishing licences, as well as the sale of public transport tickets. Selected shops are also able to sell national rail and bus transport tickets.

R-kioski is known as "Ärrä" (the name of the letter R in Finnish) in common language. The company slogan is "Nopeaa ja mukavaa on asiointi" (It's swift and convenient to shop).

The first R-kiosk in Estonia opened in 1993, and  there are 107 shops in Estonia. Reitan Convenience posted a turnover of 1.63 billion Euros in 2017. Reitan Convenience invested 18 million Euros in R-kioski in 2013 and 2014 together. The money was invested to broaden the product selection as well as to lower the price of food to par with other retail chains competing in the same market such as Alepa and Siwa.

History

The company dates back to 1910. The business was originally conceived by several major Finnish publishing houses as a newsagent for railway stations ("Rautakirja" was itself shortened from "Rautatiekirjakauppa" which translates to "railway bookshop"). It was later extended to other venues and products. The name R-kioski was adopted in 1958.

On 5 March 2012, it was announced that the Reitan Group bought R-kioski from Sanoma for roughly 130 million Euros. The group had been working on the purchase for a decade, but previous negotiations had stranded as R-kioski had demanded a merger where they owned 51 percent. The purchase brought the Reitan Group to 2,500 kiosk outlets, making it the second-largest kiosk group in Europe. The company operated also in Romania, but sold operations to R-kioski Romania CEO Dan Vasile in 2011. The name R-kioski was to be abandoned in Romania after a grace period following the corporate acquisition.

Former company slogans include "Kaiken lisäksi lähellä" (To top it off, it's near by), "Äkkiä R-kioskille" (Swiftly to R-kioski),  "R-kioskilla kaikki käy" (We accept everything at R-kioski or Everyone visits R-kioski) and "R-Kioski — Sellaisena kuin sinä haluat" (R-Kioski — as you want it).

References

Notes

External links

 R-kioski Finland
 R-kioski Estonia

Convenience stores
Retail companies established in 1910
Retail companies of Finland